The Coates Opera House was a prominent performing arts venue and cultural landmark in Kansas City, Missouri from its founding in 1870 to its destruction in a fire in 1901. It was built by Kersey Coates, a local hotelier. The House was the first legitimate theater in Kansas City. It was located on the northwest corner of 10th and Broadway.

Heart and Sword, starring Walker Whiteside and Leilia Wolstan was the last performance in the theatre.

Playwright and actor John A. Stevens managed the opera house for the 1871–72 and 1872–73 seasons (its second and third seasons).

Notes

References

 
 

Theatres in Kansas City, Missouri
Former theatres in the United States
Music venues completed in 1870
Buildings and structures demolished in 1901
Burned buildings and structures in the United States
1870 establishments in Missouri
Burned theatres
1901 disestablishments in Missouri